Maria Gardena (born Herthilde Gabloner; 1920 – 2008) was an Italian film actress and later architect.

Herthilde Gabloner was the daughter of sculptor Ignaz Gabloner and studied architecture in Rome. During those years had a brief acting career. Her last film was The Children Are Watching Us (1944), directed by Vittorio De Sica.

External links
 

1920 births
2008 deaths
Italian film actresses
Italian women architects
20th-century Italian actresses
Actors from Bolzano
Date of birth missing
Date of death missing